Hiraldo "Chico" Ruiz Sablón (December 5, 1938 – February 9, 1972) was a Cuban-American professional baseball player. An infielder, Ruiz played in Major League Baseball for the Cincinnati Reds and California Angels from 1964 through 1971. He was the only major-league player ever to pinch-hit for Johnny Bench. He is, however, best remembered for a play he made his rookie season. His steal of home against the Philadelphia Phillies on September 21, 1964 has entered baseball folklore. Viewed by most over the years as "mad" or "zany," the play received a revisionist defense that put it in perspective as a daring and worthwhile gamble. It is often viewed as the turning point of the Phillies late season standings collapse in 1964.

Early years
Ruiz was born in Santo Domingo, Cuba, on December 5, 1938. His father, who owned a cigar factory, wanted Giraldo to succeed him in running the business. However, Chico attended college, where he studied architecture. His brother, Julio, later headed the labor force of Cubatabaco, which absorbed the Sablón business and various other private-sector tobacco enterprises.

He was among the last of the Cuban players to make it out of Cuba before the borders were sealed. Though he was a shortstop by trade, he made all 79 of his appearances on the field at either second or third base.

Ruiz married Isabel Suárez Navarro on October 4, 1961. They later had two daughters, Isis and Bárbara Isa.

"The Curse of Chico Ruiz"
On September 21, 1964, facing Art Mahaffey and the Philadelphia Phillies, Ruiz singled with one out in the sixth and the score 0–0. He advanced to third base on a single by Vada Pinson; however, Pinson made the second out of the inning trying to stretch it into a double. With two outs, Frank Robinson stepped to the plate.

Though in later years Mahaffey recalled he had gotten two strikes on Robinson, newspaper accounts at the time showed, in actuality, the count was 0–1. Ruiz, noting Mahaffey had used a long windup on the first pitch, broke for home on the next delivery. Seeing the runner, a rattled Mahaffey rushed and uncorked a pitch which Phillies catcher Clay Dalrymple could not handle. Ruiz stole home, accounting for the only run of the game. Then and later, Ruiz's decision was viewed as a bad one, considering that Robinson—Cincinnati's best hitter—was up. Sabermetric analysis, however, shows that it was not a bad percentage play.

At the start of that game, the Phillies had a -game hold on first place with 12 games to play. The Phillies then lost ten straight games to finish tied for second place. Phillies third baseman Dick Allen is quoted in Crash, The Life and Times of Dick Allen by Tim Whitaker as saying that the play "broke our humps". Chico Ruiz's steal of home has evolved into a popular culture legend. Some Philadelphia sports fans still refer to the "Curse of Chico Ruiz" as the reason for many of the misfortunes of the team over time. A novel by Gregory T. Glading entitled 64 Intruder centers on what might have happened had Ruiz been called out on the play.

"Bench me or trade me"
With Pete Rose at second, Deron Johnson at third and Leo Cárdenas at short, Ruiz was squeezed out of a very solid infield, and saw very little playing time over the next two seasons. He took it in stride, bringing a cushion to sit on the bench, a pair of special soft, comfortable alligator spiked shoes and a battery-driven fan the people in St. Louis gave him at their games to keep himself cool and comfortable on the bench.

His chance finally arrived in  when Cárdenas broke his finger. He performed admirably in Cárdenas' absence, batting .283 with five runs scored and four runs batted in while providing solid defense at short. This was followed with a two-week stint at second while second baseman Tommy Helms shifted over to short. During the hot summer stretch, Ruiz said playing every day was killing him and jokingly demanded to Reds manager Dave Bristol, "Bench me or trade me."

Regardless of his "demand", Ruiz remained with the Reds for two more seasons. Following the  season, he and outfielder Alex Johnson were traded to the California Angels for pitchers Pedro Borbón, Jim McGlothlin and Vern Geishert.

Angels and Alex Johnson
Despite Johnson having a reputation as a malcontent, he and Ruiz were good friends. In fact, Ruiz was the godfather of Johnson's adopted daughter. However, during spring training in  several bouts of "indifferent play" landed him in the middle of Angels manager Lefty Phillips' crosshairs. The trend continued into the regular season as Johnson was benched three times in May for indifferent play. Meanwhile, the relationship between Ruiz and Johnson also began to sour. Johnson would scream obscenities at Ruiz whenever they were near each other, and Ruiz had reportedly challenged Johnson to a fight on more than one occasion, regardless of the fact that Ruiz was much smaller.

Tensions hit a climax when Johnson claimed that Ruiz pointed a gun at him while the two were in the clubhouse following a June 13 loss to the Washington Senators. Ruiz denied the claim but Angels GM Dick Walsh later admitted during Johnson's arbitration case over his suspension that the incident had indeed occurred. Shortly after the alleged incident, Ruiz was demoted to the Triple-A Salt Lake City Angels.

The Angels would clean house after the season. Phillips and Walsh were both fired, Johnson was traded to the Cleveland Indians, and Ruiz was released. Shortly afterwards, Ruiz signed with the Kansas City Royals.

Death
Ruiz became a United States citizen on January 7, 1972, something which made him very proud. Early in the morning of February 9, just before he was to join his new team, the Royals, in spring training, Ruiz was killed when he drove his car into a sign pole while driving alone outside of San Diego. Alex Johnson attended the funeral.

See also

 List of baseball players who died during their careers

References

External links

Venezuelan Professional Baseball League statistics

1938 births
1972 deaths
People from Santo Domingo, Cuba
California Angels players
Cincinnati Reds players
Columbia Reds players
Cuban emigrants to the United States
Geneva Redlegs players
Indianapolis Indians players
Industriales de Valencia players
Leones del Caracas players
Major League Baseball infielders
Major League Baseball players from Cuba
Cuban expatriate baseball players in the United States
Navegantes del Magallanes players
Cuban expatriate baseball players in Venezuela
Road incident deaths in California
Salt Lake City Angels players
San Diego Padres (minor league) players
Tiburones de La Guaira players
Visalia Redlegs players